Oßling (German) or Wóslink (Upper Sorbian) is a municipality in the district of Bautzen, in Saxony, Germany.

See also 
 Dubringer Moor, a local nature reserve.

References 

West Lusatia
Populated places in Bautzen (district)